Bazisnoye is a rural locality (a selo) in Petrushinsky Selsoviet of Shimanovsky District, Amur Oblast, Russia. The population was 110 as of 2018. There are 3 streets.

Geography 
Bazisnoye is located 20 km north of Shimanovsk (the district's administrative centre) by road. Razdolnoye is the nearest rural locality.

References 

Rural localities in Shimanovsky District